In mathematics and physics CCR algebras (after canonical commutation relations) and CAR algebras (after canonical anticommutation relations) arise from the quantum mechanical study of bosons and fermions respectively. They play a prominent role in quantum statistical mechanics and quantum field theory.

CCR and CAR as *-algebras

Let  be a real vector space equipped with a nonsingular real antisymmetric bilinear form  (i.e. a symplectic vector space). The unital *-algebra generated by elements of  subject to the relations

The uniqueness of the representations of this algebra when  is finite dimensional is discussed in the Stone–von Neumann theorem.

If  is equipped with a nonsingular real symmetric bilinear form  instead, the unital *-algebra generated by the elements of  subject to the relations

The C*-algebra of CCR

There is a distinct, but closely related meaning of CCR algebra, called the CCR C*-algebra. Let  be a real symplectic vector space with nonsingular symplectic form .

It is well known that the CCR algebra is a simple non-separable algebra and is unique up to isomorphism.

 
for any . The field operators  are defined for each  as the generator of the one-parameter unitary group  on the symmetric Fock space. These are self-adjoint unbounded operators, however they formally satisfy

The C*-algebra of CAR

Let  be a Hilbert space. In the theory of operator algebras the CAR algebra is the unique C*-completion of the complex unital *-algebra generated by elements  subject to the relations

for any , .

The fact that these form a C*-algebra is due to the fact that creation and annihilation operators on antisymmetric Fock space are bona-fide bounded operators. Moreover, the field operators  satisfy

giving the relationship with Section 1.

Superalgebra generalization
The unital *-algebra generated by the elements of  subject to the relations

In mathematics, the abstract structure of the CCR and CAR algebras, over any field, not just the complex numbers, is studied by the name of Weyl and Clifford algebras, where many significant results have accrued. One of these is that the graded generalizations of Weyl and Clifford algebras allow the basis-free formulation of the canonical commutation and anticommutation relations in terms of a symplectic and a symmetric non-degenerate bilinear form. In addition, the binary elements in this graded Weyl algebra give a basis-free version of the commutation relations of the symplectic and indefinite orthogonal Lie algebras.

See also
 Bose–Einstein statistics
 Fermi–Dirac statistics
 Glossary of string theory
 Heisenberg group
 Bogoliubov transformation
 (−1)F

References

Quantum field theory
Axiomatic quantum field theory
Functional analysis
Algebras
C*-algebras